The Scottish Labour Party (SLP) was a socialist party in Scotland that was active between 1976 and 1981. It formed as a breakaway from the UK Labour Party. It won three council seats in 1977 but lost its MPs at the 1979 election and was dissolved two years later.

History
The party formed on 18 January 1976 as a breakaway from the UK Labour Party, by members disaffected with the then Labour Government's failure to secure a devolved Scottish Assembly, as well as with its social and economic agenda. The formation of the SLP was led by Jim Sillars, then MP for South Ayrshire, John Robertson, then MP for Paisley and Alex Neil, the UK Labour Party's senior Scottish researcher.

The split came just before the resignation of Harold Wilson as prime minister and party leader and the election of James Callaghan as his successor.

Within a few weeks of its formation, The Glasgow Herald reported that a System Three opinion poll showed the party was taking a quarter of the Labour Party's electoral support in Scotland. The same poll also gave the SLP a higher share of support in Scotland (8%) than the well-established Liberal Party (6%). Neil was reported to be "staggered and delighted by this wonderful result" and warned that SLP could expect to make gains in areas of urban deprivation in the west of Scotland that usually supported Labour.

Almost immediately the SLP became the focus for entryism from the International Marxist Group (IMG), and at the party's first congress in October 1976 the IMG was expelled, along with a number of branches whose members were not associated with the IMG.  According to Henry Drucker's account, the IMG's role was rather limited; Sillars used this as an excuse for purging anyone he did not see entirely eye-to-eye with or represented a significant threat to his leadership.

The expellees formed a rival Scottish Labour Party (Democratic Wing), and this in turn later renamed itself the Scottish Socialist League (SSL). Gradually, those members of the SSL who had not been associated with the IMG drifted out, and the SSL was reabsorbed into the Trotskyist Fourth International.

The SLP had little electoral success, winning only three council seats at the 1977 local elections. It polled only 583 votes in the Garscadden by-election in 1978. At the 1979 general election, the SLP fought three seats, including Sillars' attempt at being re-elected (Robertson chose to step down). Sillars came close to retaining his seat in South Ayrshire, but this was clearly a personal vote built up over the years he had already served as an MP, as the other two candidates polled poorly indeed.

This failure prompted the SLP to disband in 1981; and members either fell out of active politics, re-joined the Labour Party, or chose to join the Scottish National Party (SNP), which both Sillars and Neil did, with both rising to high office in the SNP.

The SLP adventure is generally looked upon as an ambitious failure, but Sillars has himself put this down to a lack of planning before the decision to launch the party. Unlike the SLP, the Social Democratic Party (SDP) meticulously planned their breakaway from the Labour Party, and were much more successful. Sillars has claimed that the SLP did at least provide a forerunner to the SNP's later dialogue with the left.

The SLP had a number of members who would later go on to achieve a name for themselves as mainstream Labour politicians, including John McAllion who became MP and then MSP for Dundee East, Maria Fyfe one time MP for Glasgow Maryhill, Colin Boyd, later Lord Advocate, Sheriff Shiona Waldron, and Charlie Gordon, later MSP for Glasgow Cathcart. These individuals chose to join (or in some cases re-join) the Labour Party rather than follow Sillars into the SNP.

Electoral performance

See also
Scottish Workers Republican Party
Scottish Labour Party (1994–present), modern party that is the UK Labour Party's devolved Scotland administrative subdivision.

References

Bibliography
H. M. Drucker: Breakaway: The Scottish Labour Party, Edinburgh: EUSPB (1977)

Defunct socialist parties in the United Kingdom
Labour parties in Scotland
Political parties established in 1976
International Marxist Group
Home rule in the United Kingdom
Defunct political parties in Scotland
Labour Party (UK) breakaway groups
Scottish National Party
1976 establishments in Scotland